The 1947–48 Cornell Big Red men's ice hockey season was the 41st season of play for the program. The teams was coached by Bud Boeringer in his 1st season.

Season
In the first season for the Big Red without Nick Bawlf in 32 years, the team had a dismal performance. The hope for the season was quickly quashed in the first game when Army trounced the nearly all-sophomore Cornell squad to the tune of 0–9. The team didn't get much better as the year went on; after a second shutout loss the following weekend, Cornell had to wait on the sideline for four weeks before they were able to play their third match.

The team, as it had since 1942, could only manage 4 contests on the year. For the third time in four years, they lost every one. To make matters worse, they weren't even competitive in any of their games, with the closest score being 2–10. The lack of practice time due to still using Lake Beebe as their primary surface was just too great an obstacle to overcome. This was also the first year that the NCAA sponsored ice hockey, which meant that the sport was becoming much more than just a fad for some schools.

After the year, with no chance to the program's fortunes on the horizon, Cornell decided to shelve the ice hockey team. In the decade afterwards, the flame for the program was kept alive long enough for the school to secure funding for the first on-campus rink. Completed in 1957, the Lynah Rink enable Cornell to return to the ice and keep the tradition alive for the Big Red.

Roster

Standings

Schedule and results

|-
!colspan=12 style=";" | Regular Season

References

1947–48
Cornell
Cornell
Cornell